There are 105 Sea Scout Groups in the United Kingdom and one group in Gibraltar who are affiliated to the Royal Navy in order to foster a close relationship between the Royal Navy and young people in the Scout Association by making naval facilities and equipment accessible. It is seen as a mark of great honour by the Groups holding RN Recognition.

History 

Sea Scouting in the U.K. began in 1908, one year after the establishment of Scouting itself. During World War I Sea Scouts performed duties as coastal lookouts and messengers and, in recognition of these deeds, were formally recognised by the Admiralty Board in 1919, this allowed them access to Naval equipment and facilities whilst still remaining independent of any Naval control.

During World War II the scheme was converted so that Sea Scout groups who show themselves able to reach certain levels of proficiency could apply for stores and grants to help train young men in basic seamanship before entering military service. The scheme has been running since then, overseen by Second Sea Lord / Commander-in-Chief Naval Home Command and regulated by a Memorandum of Agreement (MOA) between the Ministry of Defence (MoD) and the Scout Association.

Although there are some 425-450 Sea Scout groups throughout the U.K., the MoD recognises a maximum of 105. In order to remain in the scheme groups must maintain high standards. Any Sea Scout group can apply for recognition subject to certain criteria laid down in the MOA.

Unlike the Sea Cadet Corps, Sea Scouts are not financially supported by the MoD, apart from an annual capitation grant to the Scout Association. The driving force behind groups applying for and remaining in the Royal Naval recognition scheme is the kudos and associated pride.

Privileges 

There are a number of privileges afforded to Groups that make it into the 105, including:

Leaders, Explorers, Scouts and Cubs wear Royal Navy Recognition Badge.
Group wears defaced Red Ensign and flies Admiralty Pennant.
Eligible to attend Big Four Events:
Summer Camp, HMS BRISTOL, Portsmouth.
Soccer Sixes, HMS BRISTOL, Portsmouth.
Swimming Gala, HMS RALEIGH, Plymouth.
Explorer Camp, HMS BRISTOL, Portsmouth.
Eligible to utilise HMS BRISTOL's facilities and RN Sailing Centre Assets.
Visit Portsmouth Heritage area attractions at heavily discounted rates.
Annual payment to the Scout Association (Admiralty Fund) based on a per capita payment for each Scout and Explorer Scout plus an allowance for certain badges as detailed in the Memorandum of Agreement.
Eligible to apply for grants from Scout Association for purchase of equipment and boats.
On joining an initial Stores outfit is issued.

Inspection 

Groups are inspected every 18 months - 2 years by an RN Officer, This is a formal inspection, usually alternating between water-borne and land based, where the Groups can show off their skills and worthiness to be recognised by the RN.

Recognised groups

See also

Sea Scouts (The Scout Association)
Sea Scouts
Scouts
Royal Navy

References

External links
RN Sea Scouts

Royal Navy
The Scout Association
Sea Scouting